McAsey is a surname. Notable people with the surname include:

Alan McAsey (born 1937), Australian rules footballer
Chris McAsey (born 1962), Australian rules footballer
Chris McAsey (rower), New Zealand rower
Darren McAsey (born 1965), Australian rules footballer
Emily McAsey (born 1978), American politician